708 Raphaela is a minor planet orbiting the Sun.

Observations performed at the Palmer Divide Observatory in Colorado Springs, Colorado during 2007 produced a light curve with a period of 20.918 hours with a brightness amplitude of 0.45 ± 0.02 in magnitude.

References

External links 
 Lightcurve plot of 708 Raphaela, Palmer Divide Observatory, B. D. Warner (2007)
 Asteroid Lightcurve Database (LCDB), query form (info )
 Dictionary of Minor Planet Names, Google books
 Asteroids and comets rotation curves, CdR – Observatoire de Genève, Raoul Behrend
 Discovery Circumstances: Numbered Minor Planets (1)-(5000) – Minor Planet Center
 
 

000708
Discoveries by Joseph Helffrich
Named minor planets
000708
19110203